David Humphreys may refer to:

 David Humphreys (soldier) (1752–1818), American Revolutionary War soldier and poet
 David Humphreys (rugby union) (born 1971), Irish rugby player
 David Campbell Humphreys (1817–1879), U.S. federal judge
 David Humphreys (cyclist) (1936–2021), Australian cyclist
 David Carlisle Humphreys (1855–1921), engineer, architect, educator and co-founder of Omicron Delta Kappa
 David L. Humphreys (born 1939), Canadian journalist, writer, lobbyist, and consultant

See also
 David Humphries (1953–2020), English cricketer
 David Humphrey (born 1955), American painter and art critic